WCQA-LD, virtual channel 16 (VHF digital channel 12), is a low-powered Court TV-affiliated television station licensed to Springfield, Illinois, United States. The station is owned by HC2 Holdings.

History 
The station's construction permit was initially issued on February 25, 2010 under the calls of W16CQ-D and was later changed to WCQA-LD.

Digital channels
The station's digital signal is multiplexed:

References

External links
DTV America

Low-power television stations in the United States
Innovate Corp.
Television stations in Illinois
Television channels and stations established in 2010
2010 establishments in Illinois